Ettore Casati (Chiavenna, 24 March 1873 – Rome, 8 August 1945) was an Italian jurist and magistrate, who served as Minister of Justice of the Badoglio I Cabinet from February to April 1944, and as President of the Supreme Court of Cassation from 1941 to 1945.

Biography

After graduating in law from the University of Milan, he was appointed councilor and later judge at the Tribunal of Milan, and from 6 November 1941 he was president of the Supreme Court of Cassation. After the armistice of Cassibile he refused to collaborate with the Italian Social Republic and crossed the frontline, fleeing to Allied-controlled southern Italy, where he became president of the Commission on the illicit enrichments of the Fascist leaders and on 15 February 1944 he was appointed Minister of Justice of the Badoglio I Cabinet, a post he held until 17 April 1944. On 27 July 1944 he was appointed president of the High Court of Justice for crimes committed by members of the Fascist government; he signed the decree for the epuration of Fascist officials. He died in 1945, shortly after the end of the war; his Manual of Italian Civil Law was published posthumously in 1947.

References

1873 births
1945 deaths
Government ministers of Italy
Italian Ministers of Justice
Italian judges
20th-century Italian jurists

it:Ettore Casati